Lion Rock Spirit, is said to be the core value that is inherited by Hong Kong people from generation to generation.

This term originated from the theme song of a 1970s TV series, Below the Lion Rock, which portrays the real-life situation of Hong Kong people during the period. This spirit enables the Hong Kong people to achieve the great socio-economical advancement that transforms Hong Kong into the current cosmopolitan Asian Financial Centre.

Origin of Lion Rock Spirit

RTHK's Below the Lion Rock drama series began in 1973. It addressed the living conditions of the poorest sector as well as the working class who lived in the public housing estates and squatter huts below the Lion Rock in the 1970s. They worked hard to collectively rebuild Hong Kong after World War II. The series highlighted the commonly shared core values of Hong Kong people, namely the "Lion Rock Spirit". RTHK described the "Lion Rock Spirit" as "perseverance and solidarity".

Background of traditional Lion Rock Spirit

In the 1970s, "Lion Rock Spirit" was embodied by the poorest sector in Hong Kong who rode through ups and downs together. It was a daily challenge for the citizens to make a living. They could only afford simple foods and their stomachs are not always as full as they wished to be. Besides, not all children could further study after the free education. In 1976, the Director of Education stated that 68,000 children between age of 10 to 14 had discontinued their education as their parents could not support the tuition fees, and some had to start working to support their families. However, they stayed optimistic and persevered in facing their challenges.

Despite the poor living standard of Hong Kong people, the 1970s is said to be characterised by rapid economic development and expansion. This is attributed to the surge in labour force. After the period of baby boomers, an influx of mainland Chinese emigrated to Hong Kong in a bid to escape from the social instability caused by war and persecution in mainland China. The mainland emigrants worked hard to strive for betterment in their living standard. Most importantly, all of the Hong Kong citizens upheld the "Lion Rock Spirit" and worked hard together to build a secure and prosperous future.

Cultural influence of Below the Lion Rock 

The theme song of Below the Lion Rock is a witness of the livelihood in the 1970s. Despite popularity of the song, the symbolic meanings of its lyrics have not generated great cultural significance until Mr. Anthony Leung, the former financial secretary, cited the last stanza of the lyrics in his budget address in 2002. He borrowed the lyrics to boost the morale of Hong Kong citizens, by reminding them to uphold the "Lion Rock Spirit" when facing severe budgetary deficit and economic gloom. He encouraged citizens from all walks of life to put aside their differences, so as to co-operate in overcoming the economic adversaries.

Since then, "Lion Rock Spirit" has become a symbol of cultural identity of Hong Kong people. Its lyrics have concurrently been referred to in numerous festive and official events, for example, Mr. Zhu Rongji, Premier of People's Republic of China included part of the lyrics in his speech. This reflected the central government would support Hong Kong to emerge from its economic woes. Thus, the "Lion Rock Spirit" is commonly used by businessmen and political leaders to associate the citizens and boost their morale when facing social challenges.

Core values reflected in the lyrics

The last stanza of the lyrics of Below the Lion Rock that symbolises the core values of "Lion Rock Spirit":

1. Of one mind in pursuit of our dream, All discord set aside, with one heart on the same bright quest, Hand in hand to the ends of the Earth.

Solidarity is upheld by Hong Kongers. They would disregard of social classes and ethnic differences, so as to collectively overcome the adversaries "on the same boat". For instance, the whole family worked together to produce plastic flowers or to put stickers on toys to sustain the family's living.

2. Fearless and valiant inside, Rough terrain no respite. Side by side we overcome ills, As the Hong Kong story we write.

Perseverance of Hong Kong people is reflected. Hong Kong people weigh upon the motto of "never give up" in the face of challenges. They believed they could "create miracles from the impossible" as long as they worked hard and supported each other to fulfill their life goals.

By upholding solidarity and perseverance of "Lion Rock Spirit", HongKongers are empowered with the collective strength to conquer traumatic events like the Asian Financial Crisis in 1997, and SARS epidemic in 2003.

Existence of Lion Rock Spirit in modern Hong Kong

With rapid socio-economic advancement, families have become more prosperous. Living standard has risen to an extent that it is different from the adverse living conditions in the 1970s. Children nowadays can receive free education. Moreover, foods are more abundant to an extent that the government is obliged to encourage citizens to reduce food wastage. Due to enhancement in the living standard of Hong Kong people, their problems have changed from maintaining a secured living environment to pursuing political advancement. Simultaneously, the meaning of "Lion Rock Spirit" among the new generation has changed according to the current social context. It includes not merely the support for each other in a physical manner, but in a spiritual or political way.

The rise of Modernized Lion Rock Spirit

The "Lion Rock Spirit" has in recent years been modernised to express the socio-political aspirations of Hong Kong protestors for real democracy, social equality and justice. The young people have become more mobilised to voice out their opinions and demands through active political participation. More young people assembled together to join protests and public consultations on issues like moral and national education, the amendments in housing policies and democratic reform for genuine universal suffrage in the legislative and executive positions. The "Lion Rock Spirit" has been redefined by the new generation through integrating the traditionally shared values of solidarity and perseverance to strive for upward social mobility and economic advancement, with the recent socio-political context in fighting for a just and fair society. Thus, the "Lion Rock Spirit" is subject to redefinition as the social context changes.

See also
 Culture of Hong Kong
 Sense of community
 Classical liberalism
 Kiasu

References

Further reading
Modernized Lion Rock Spirit in political context:
Mak, Sarah Y., T. "Everyday Imaginings Under the Lion Rock: An Analysis of Identity Formation in Hong Kong". University of California, Santa Cruz, 2013.
Cultural Identity:
陳銘匡. "從《獅子山下》到「許冠傑金曲」到 《始終有你》 : 「香港人的歌」與「香港人」有什麼關係?". Lingnan University, 2007.

Culture of Hong Kong
Hong Kong society